Ömer Kavur (18 June 1944 – 12 May 2005) was a Turkish film director, producer and screenwriter. He directed fourteen films between 1974 and 2003. His film, Gece Yolculuğu was screened in the Un Certain Regard section at the 1988 Cannes Film Festival. Nine years later, his film Akrebin Yolculuğu was screened in the same section at the 1997 Festival.

He died on 12 May 2005, of lymphoma at his home in Teşvikiye, Istanbul, and was buried at the Zincirlikuyu Cemetery following the religious funeral service held at the Teşvikiye Mosque.

Filmography
 Yatık Emine (1974)
 Yusuf ile Kenan (1979)
 Kırık bir aşk hikâyesi (1981)
 Ah güzel Istanbul (1981)
 Göl (1982)
 Körebe (1985)
 Amansız Yol (1985)
 Gece Yolculuğu (1987)
 Anayurt Oteli (1987)
 Gizli yüz (1991)
 Aşk üzerine söylenmemis hersey (1996)
 Akrebin Yolculuğu (1997)
 Melekler Evi (2000)
 Karşılaşma (2003)

References

External links
 

1944 births
2005 deaths
Turkish film directors
Turkish film producers
Turkish male screenwriters
People from Ankara
Burials at Zincirlikuyu Cemetery
Kabataş Erkek Lisesi alumni
Deaths from cancer in Turkey
Deaths from lymphoma
20th-century Turkish screenwriters